Geneviève Asse (Vannes, France, 24 January 1923 – 11 August 2021) was a French painter. She died in August 2021 at the age of 98. She was awarded the Grand-Cross of the National Order of the Legion of Honour.

Geneviève Asse is one of the most notable abstract French painters of the post-war era. The characteristic shade of blue she created had been called "le bleu Asse".

Collections 
 Musée des Beaux-Arts de Tours, Horizons, oil on canvas
 musée des Beaux-Arts de Quimper, Vertical Collage I, oil on canvas
 Musée d'Arts de Nantes
 Musée d'art moderne de la ville de Paris
Musée National d'Art Moderne Centre Pompidou

Bibliography 
 Christian Briend, Isabelle Ewig, Silvia Baron-Supervielle, Camille Morando, Geneviève Asse : Peintures, Paris, Somogy, 2013 
 Élisabeth Védrenne et Valérie de Maulmin, Les Pionnières : dans les ateliers des femmes artistes du 20eme siecle, photographies de Catherine Panchout, Paris, Somogy éditions d'art, 2018

References

External links
 Geneviève Asse at AWARE

1923 births
2021 deaths
Artists from Vannes
20th-century French women artists
21st-century French women artists
French women painters
20th-century French painters
21st-century French painters
Grand Croix of the Légion d'honneur